The 2013–14 Süper Lig (known as the Spor Toto Süper Lig for sponsorship reasons) was the 56th season of the Süper Lig, the highest tier football league of Turkey. The season began on 17 August 2013. Galatasaray were the defending champions, but Fenerbahçe matched their league title record of 19 after drawing 0–0 with Çaykur Rizespor on 27 April.

Teams 

İstanbul BB, Orduspor and Mersin İdman Yurdu were relegated at the end of the 2012–13 season after finishing in the bottom three places of the standings. İstanbul B.B. was at top level for six years, Orduspor and Mersin İY returned to second level after two years. The relegated teams were replaced by 2012–13 TFF First League champions Kayseri Erciyesspor, runners-up Çaykur Rizespor and play-off winners Konyaspor. They returned to the top division after six, five and two years, respectively.

Team overview

Managerial changes

League table

Results

Positions by round 

The following table represents the teams position after each round in the competition.

Attendances

Statistics

Top goalscorers

Top assists

Hat-tricks

Clean sheets

Player
As of 9 March 2014.

Club
 Most clean sheets: 13
 Beşiktaş
 Fewest clean sheets: 5
 Elazığspor

References

External links

2013-14
Turk
1